John Woon (born 1823, date of death unknown) was a Union Navy sailor in the American Civil War and a recipient of the U.S. military's highest decoration, the Medal of Honor, for his actions during the Battle of Grand Gulf.

Born in 1823 in England, Woon immigrated to the United States and was living in New York when he joined the U.S. Navy. At the Battle of Grand Gulf, Mississippi, on April 29, 1863, he "had been confined to his hammock several days from sickness, yet insisted on and took command of the gun of which he was captain; fought it for over two hours, and only left it when no longer able to stand". For this action, he was awarded the Medal of Honor a few months later on July 10, 1863.

Woon's official Medal of Honor citation reads:
Serving on board the U.S.S. Pittsburg, Mississippi River, 29 April 1863. Engaging the enemy batteries at Grand Gulf, the U.S.S. Pittsburg, although severely damaged and suffering many personnel casualties, continued to fire her batteries until ordered to withdraw. Taking part in a similar action after nightfall, the U.S.S. Pittsburg received further damage, but receiving no personnel casualties in the latter action. Woon showed courage and devotion to duty throughout these bitter engagements.

References 

1823 births
Year of death unknown
English emigrants to the United States
People of New York (state) in the American Civil War
Union Navy sailors
United States Navy Medal of Honor recipients
English-born Medal of Honor recipients
American Civil War recipients of the Medal of Honor